Euagrus is a genus of spider in the family Euagridae. It was first described by Anton Ausserer in 1875. It has been referred to as "Evagrus", but this is a transcript error, not an accepted synonym. It is very similar to the genus Allothele, and several species have been transferred there, including Euagrus caffer, Euagrus regnardi, and Euagrus teretis.

Species
 it contained the following species:
Euagrus anops Gertsch, 1973 – Mexico
Euagrus atropurpureus Purcell, 1903 – South Africa
Euagrus carlos Coyle, 1988 – Mexico to Costa Rica
Euagrus cavernicola Gertsch, 1971 – Mexico
Euagrus charcus Coyle, 1988 – Mexico
Euagrus chisoseus Gertsch, 1939 – USA (Southeast Arizona to southern Texas), Mexico
Euagrus comstocki Gertsch, 1935 – USA (along the lower Rio Grande, Colorado)
Euagrus formosanus Saito, 1933 – Taiwan
Euagrus garnicus Coyle, 1988 – Mexico
Euagrus gertschi Coyle, 1988 – Mexico
Euagrus guatemalensis F. O. Pickard-Cambridge, 1897 – Guatemala
Euagrus gus Coyle, 1988 – Mexico
Euagrus josephus Chamberlin, 1924 – Mexico
Euagrus leones Coyle, 1988 – Mexico
Euagrus luteus Gertsch, 1973 – Mexico
Euagrus lynceus Brignoli, 1974 – Mexico, Guatemala
Euagrus mexicanus Ausserer, 1875 (type) – Mexico
Euagrus pristinus O. Pickard-Cambridge, 1899 – Mexico
Euagrus rothi Coyle, 1988 – USA (Baboquivari Mountains, Arizona)
Euagrus rubrigularis Simon, 1890 – Mexico
Euagrus troglodyta Gertsch, 1982 – Mexico
Euagrus zacus Coyle, 1988 – Mexico

References

External links
Euagrus at BugGuide

Euagridae
Mygalomorphae genera
Taxa named by Anton Ausserer